The molecular formula C8H3ClO3 (molar mass: 182.56 g/mol, exact mass: 181.9771 u) may refer to:

 3-Chlorophthalic anhydride
 4-Chlorophthalic anhydride

Molecular formulas